Matt Firor is a video game producer and designer of massively multiplayer online role-playing games (MMORPGs). He is best known for his involvement in games such as Dark Age of Camelot and The Elder Scrolls Online.

Biography

Matt Firor's first foray into online gaming was a failed attempt in 1987 to license The Scepter of Goth BBS MUD. The second, more successful project was the co-founding of Interesting Systems (ISI) with Rob Denton and two others, in 1990. At ISI, Firor was co-designer and lead content developer for ISI's multi-user BBS game Tempest (later renamed Darkness Falls).

ISI merged with Adventures Unlimited Software to form Mythic Entertainment in 1995. Firor stayed at Mythic from 1995 to 2006, where he was the producer of most of Mythic's titles, including the worldwide MMORPG bestseller Dark Age of Camelot and its first two expansions.

Firor was vice-president of product development at Mythic, where he was - along with COO Rob Denton - responsible for the management of all of Mythic's development projects. In 2005-06, he led Mythic's internal console technology team which assessed the future of MMORPGs on next-generation console platforms.

In June 2006, Firor left Mythic Entertainment to found Ultra Mega Games, a consulting company specializing in online gaming services. August 1, 2007, he was hired by ZeniMax Media Inc., parent company of Bethesda Softworks, to head ZeniMax Online Studios. Firor is currently the president of ZeniMax Online, and runs the division. He and his team are working on The Elder Scrolls Online.

Firor has lectured at the University of Virginia and the University of Southern California, and Massachusetts Institute of Technology, and is a frequent speaker at industry conferences.

Game credits 

 1991: Tempest (content/design)
 1996: Rolemaster: Magestorm (producer/design)
 1996: Splatterball (producer/design)
 1997: Darkness Falls (producer/design/content)
 1997: Rolemaster: Bladelands (producer)
 1998: Aliens Online (producer/design)
 1998: Starship Troopers: Battlespace (producer)
 1998: Godzilla Online (producer)
 1999: Silent Death Online (producer/lead designer)
 1999: Darkness Falls: The Crusade (producer)
 1999: Splatterball Plus (producer)
 1999: Darkstorm: The Well of Souls (producer)
 1999: Spellbinder: The Nexus Conflict (producer/design)
 2001: Dark Age of Camelot (producer/design)
 2002: Dark Age of Camelot: Shrouded Isles (producer/design)
 2003: Dark Age of Camelot: Trials of Atlantis (executive producer)
 2004: Dark Age of Camelot: Catacombs (executive producer)
 2014: The Elder Scrolls Online (director)

References 

Video game designers
Living people
MUD developers
Year of birth missing (living people)